Ethminolia iridifulgens is a species of sea snail, a marine gastropod mollusk in the family Trochidae, the top snails.

Description
The height of the shell attains 4 mm, its diameter 6 mm. The umbilicate shell has a conical shape. It has five, striated, ventricose whorls. The two apical whorls are white. The body whorl increases rapidly in size and is rotund at the periphery. The umbilicus goes deep. The aperture is rotund and has a fine lip. The columella is simple. This rare, very fragile shell is brilliantly nacreous. Its colour is green, with violet and blue iris hues occurring. The somewhat fugitive outer cuticle shows rufous flames, depicted on a greyish ground.

Distribution
This species occurs in the Arabian Sea and the Gulf of Oman.

References

 Bosch D.T., Dance S.P., Moolenbeek R.G. & Oliver P.G. (1995) Seashells of eastern Arabia. Dubai: Motivate Publishing. 296 pp.

iridifulgens
Gastropods described in 1910